Matías Alejandro Rey (born 1 December 1984) is an Argentine field hockey player who plays as a defender for the Argentine national team.

Rey joined Real Club de Polo in Spain in 2005 and after fifteen consecutive seasons, he will return to Argentina at the end of 2020.

International career
He competed in the field hockey competition at the 2016 Summer Olympics, where he won the gold medal. In July 2019, he was selected in the Argentina squad for the 2019 Pan American Games. They won the gold medal by defeating Canada 5-2 in the final. He was named the Player of the Tournament at the 2022 Men's Pan American Cup where he won his third Pan American Cup with the national team.

References

External links

Living people
1984 births
Field hockey players from Buenos Aires
Argentine male field hockey players
Olympic field hockey players of Argentina
Male field hockey defenders
2006 Men's Hockey World Cup players
Field hockey players at the 2007 Pan American Games
2010 Men's Hockey World Cup players
2014 Men's Hockey World Cup players
Field hockey players at the 2015 Pan American Games
Field hockey players at the 2016 Summer Olympics
2018 Men's Hockey World Cup players
Field hockey players at the 2019 Pan American Games
Olympic gold medalists for Argentina
Medalists at the 2016 Summer Olympics
Pan American Games gold medalists for Argentina
Pan American Games silver medalists for Argentina
Olympic medalists in field hockey
Pan American Games medalists in field hockey
Real Club de Polo de Barcelona players
División de Honor de Hockey Hierba players
Expatriate field hockey players
Argentine expatriate sportspeople in Spain
Medalists at the 2007 Pan American Games
Medalists at the 2019 Pan American Games
Medalists at the 2015 Pan American Games
Field hockey players at the 2020 Summer Olympics
Competitors at the 2022 South American Games
South American Games gold medalists for Argentina
South American Games medalists in field hockey
2023 Men's FIH Hockey World Cup players
21st-century Argentine people